The  is a museum which includes a library, reference rooms and .

It first opened in 1959 next door to Korakuen Stadium in Tokyo, Japan. In 1988, the museum moved to a new site within the Tokyo Dome.

The Hall of Fame and Museum was created as a means to contribute to the development of baseball in Japan through dedication of baseball greats—players, executives, and umpires—as Hall of Famers. In addition, the facility houses many memorable baseball materials including various kinds of baseball literature.

In order to be inducted, an individual must receive 75% of votes on the ballot, whether as an ballot for the player's division or the expert's division; a special committee is also allowed to elect individuals relating to the game such as composer Yuji Koseki (inducted in 2023), who created the famous "Rokko Oroshi" cheer song for the Hanshin Tigers.

The museum
The museum depicts numerous artifacts and moments from Japanese baseball history, ranging from uniforms of each team that has played in the Central and Pacific Leagues, in addition to American baseball memorabilia, such as that of Ken Griffey, Jr. and Babe Ruth. The uniform of Sadaharu Oh alongside the home run bats and balls in his career (most notably the bat for home run #800) are also on display.

Players inducted 

Victor Starffin (1960)
Yutaka Ikeda (1962)
Haruyasu Nakajima (1963)
Tadashi Wakabayashi (1964)
Tetsuharu Kawakami (1965)
Tsunetaro Moriyama (1966)
Kazuto Tsuruoka (1969)
Shunichi Amachi (1970)
Nobuaki Nidegawa (1970)
Shuichi Ishimoto (1972)
Sadayoshi Fujimoto (1974)
Fumio Fujimura (1974)
Hideo Nakagami (1976)
Shigeru Mizuhara (1977)
Michio Nishizawa (1977)
Kenjiro Matsuki (1978)
Shinji Hamazaki (1978)
Takehiko Bessho (1979)
Hiroshi Ohshita (1980)
Makoto Kozuru (1980)
Shigeru Chiba (1980)
Tokuji Iida (1981)
Yoshiyuki Iwamoto (1981)
Osamu Mihara (1983)
Shinji Kirihara (1984)
Shigeru Sugishita (1985)
Katsumi Shiraishi (1985)
Atsushi Aramaki (1985)
Shigeo Nagashima (1988)
Kaoru Bettou (1988)
Yukio Nishimoto (1988)
Masaichi Kaneda (1988)
Hidenosuke Shima (1989)
Katsuya Nomura (1989)
Jiro Noguchi (1989)
Juzo Sanada (1990)
Isao Harimoto (1990)
Shigeru Makino (1991)
Osamu Tsutsui (1991)
Kichiro Shimaoka (1991)
Tatsuro Hirooka (1992)
Michinori Tsubouchi (1992)
Yoshio Yoshida (1992)
Kazuhisa Inao (1993)
Minoru Murayama (1993)
Sadaharu Oh (1994)
Wally Kaname Yonamine (1994)
 Shosei Go (1995) — elected by the Special Committee
Tadashi Sugiura (1995)
Tokichiro Ishii (1995)
Motoshi Fujita (1996)
Sachio Kinugasa (1996)
Katsuo Osugi (1997)
Futoshi Nakanishi (1999)
Yoshinori Hirose (1999)
Takeshi Koba (1999)
Sadao Kondo (1999)
Tetsuya Yoneda (2000)
Rikuo Nemoto (2001)
Masaaki Koyama (2001)
Kazuhiro Yamauchi (2002)
Keishi Suzuki (2002)
Yutaka Fukumoto (2002)
Kenjiro Tamiya (2002)
Toshiharu Ueda (2003)
Junzo Sekine (2003)
Akira Ogi (2004)
Noboru Akiyama (2004)
Choji Murata (2005)
Masaaki Mori (2005)
Masayori Shimura (2005)
Hiromitsu Kadota (2006)
Morimichi Takagi (2006)
Hisashi Yamada (2006)
Yasumitsu Toyoda (2006)
Takao Kajimoto (2007)
Reiichi Matsunaga (2007)
Koji Yamamoto (2008)
Tsuneo Horiuchi (2008)
Tsutomu Wakamatsu (2009)
Seiichi Shima (2008)
Osamu Higashio (2010)
Hiromitsu Ochiai (2011)
Mutsuo Minagawa (2011)
Manabu Kitabeppu (2012)
Tsunemi Tsuda (2012)
Yutaka Ohno (2013)
Hideo Nomo (2014)
Koji Akiyama (2014)
Kazuhiro Sasaki (2014)
Atsuya Furuta (2015)
Kihachi Enomoto (2016)
Kimiyasu Kudoh (2016)
Masaki Saito (2016)
Tsutomu Ito (2017)
Masaji Hiramatsu (2017)
Senichi Hoshino (2017)
Hideki Matsui (2018)
Tomoaki Kanemoto (2018)
Kazuyoshi Tatsunami (2019)
Hiroshi Gondoh (2019)
Koichi Tabuchi (2020)
Shingo Takatsu (2022)
Masa Yamamoto (2022)
Alex Ramírez (2023)
Randy Bass (2023)

Other inductees 

Matsutaro Shoriki (1959)
Hiroshi Hiraoka (1959)
Yukio Aoi (1959)
Shin Hashido (1959)
Kiyoshi Oshikawa (1959)
Jiro Kuji (1959)
Eiji Sawamura (1959)
Iso Abe (1959)
Masaru Kageura (1965)
Masaichi Nagata (1988)
 Saburo Yokozawa (1988)
Masao Yoshida (1992)
Lefty O'Doul (2002)
Shiki Masaoka (2002)
Horace Wilson (2003)
Sakae Suzuka (2003)
Hiromori Kawashima (2006)
Kazuo Sayama (2021)
Katsuji Kawashima (2021)
Shigeyoshi Matsumae (2022)
Yūji Koseki (2023)

See also

The Meikyukai ("Association of Great Players" or "Golden Players Club") (also a Japanese baseball hall of fame)
Nisei Baseball Research Project
Professional baseball in Japan

References

External links
Japanese Baseball Hall of Fame and Museum

Buildings and structures in Bunkyō
Hall of Fame
Baseball museums and halls of fame
Museums in Tokyo
Sports museums in Japan
Museums established in 1959
Awards established in 1959
1959 establishments in Japan
Halls of fame in Japan